Khelil Bouhageb (27 August 1863 in Tunis – 8 February 1942 in La Marsa) was a Tunisian politician and reformer. He served as Prime Minister of Tunisia from 1926 to 1932, after the death of Mustapha Dinguizli. Bouhageb was the son of Sheikh Salem Bouhageb; his brother was the doctor Hassine Bouhageb.

Biography 
He studied at Sadiki Secondary School in Tunis and then at Saint-Louis High School in Paris. Became a member of the Khaldounia Board of Directors in 1898, he married on 5 April 1900 in Cairo, Princess Nazli Fazıl, granddaughter of Mehemet Ali.

On 22 April 1915 he became president of the Tunis court and then president of the municipality of Tunis (Sheikh El Medina) on 19 October the same year. He was appointed Minister of the Pen on 22 May 1922 and Grand Vizier of Tunis on 3 November 1926 after the death of Mustapha Dinguizli. He was sacked in 1932 by Ahmed II Bey because of his independence of mind, victim of intrigues of the Bey's entourage.

Khelil Bouhageb does not leave a descendant. He is buried with his father, Sheikh Salem Bouhageb, and his brother, Dr. Hassine Bouhageb.

References
Sadok Zmerli et Hamadi Sahili, Figures tunisiennes, éd. Dar al-Gharb al-Islami, Beyrouth, 1993, p. 310

1863 births
1942 deaths
People from Tunis
Prime Ministers of Tunisia